Nicolás Giménez (born 17 April 1997) is an Argentine professional footballer who plays as a centre-back.

Career
Giménez signed for Rosario Central's academy from Club Remedios on 27 September 2011. He was first named in a senior matchday squad in May 2016, when he remained on the bench as the club drew at home to Quilmes in the Argentine Primera División. His professional debut arrived in the league two years later, with the defender being substituted on for the final eleven minutes of a 1–1 tie with Estudiantes. A first start came in the following campaign against Vélez Sarsfield, which preceded a third and final appearance for Rosario in the Copa Argentina versus Sol de Mayo on 26 February 2019.

In July 2019, Giménez headed to Primera B Nacional with San Martín. He wouldn't appear competitively for them, though was on the substitute's bench once for a fixture with Sarmiento in August. On 5 February 2020, Giménez joined USL Championship side Real Monarchs. His debut, which was delayed due to the COVID-19 pandemic, arrived on 11 July in a home defeat to the San Diego Loyal; after he had replaced Dayonn Harris off the bench. A further twelve appearances followed, before his departure at the end of the 2020 season.

Career statistics
.

References

External links

1997 births
Living people
People from Rosario Department
Argentine footballers
Association football defenders
Argentine expatriate footballers
Expatriate soccer players in the United States
Argentine expatriate sportspeople in the United States
Argentine Primera División players
USL Championship players
Rosario Central footballers
San Martín de Tucumán footballers
Real Monarchs players
Sportspeople from Santa Fe Province